The 1901 Kansas Jayhawks football team was an American football team that represented the University of Kansas as an independent during the 1901 college football season. In its first and only season under head coach John H. Outland (namesake of the Outland Trophy), the team compiled a 3–5–2 record and was outscored by a total of 147 to 92.

Schedule

References

Kansas
Kansas Jayhawks football seasons
Kansas Jayhawks football